This article provides a summary of results for Canadian general elections (where all seats are contested) to the House of Commons, the elected lower half of Canada's federal bicameral legislative body, the Parliament of Canada. The number of seats has increased steadily over time, from 180 for the first election to the current total of 338. The current federal government structure was established in 1867 by the Constitution Act.

For federal by-elections (for one or a few seats as a result of retirement, etc.) see List of federal by-elections in Canada. For the eight general elections of the Province of Canada held in 1843 to 1864 before confederation in 1867, see List of elections in the Province of Canada. There were also earlier elections in Canada, such as for the Legislative Assembly of Upper Canada (held in 1792–1836, now part of Ontario) and the Legislative Assembly of Lower Canada (held in 1792–1834, now part of Quebec).

Two political parties have dominated politics in Canada: the Liberal Party and the historic Conservative party (known as the Progressive Conservative Party from 1942 to 2003). If one regards the modern Conservative Party as the successor to the historic one, then these are the only two parties to have formed a government, although often as the lead party in a minority or coalition government with one or more smaller parties (the 1917 win was by a pro-conscription Unionist coalition of former Liberals and Conservatives).

Although government has primarily been a two-party system, Canadian federal politics has been a multi-party affair since the 1920s, during which there was significant parliamentary presence of the Progressive Party and the United Farmers movement. They were supplanted by the Social Credit Party and the Co-operative Commonwealth Federation (CCF) in the 1930s. The CCF evolved into the New Democratic Party (NDP) in 1961. The Social Credit Party and the CCF/NDP won the third and fourth most seats between them from the 1930s, until the Social Credit Party failed to win any seats in the 1980 election.

Since 1980, the NDP has remained a presence in the Canadian parliament, but the situation amongst other non-government parties has been more complex. The Progressive Conservative Party never recovered from its spectacular defeat in the 1993 election (when it went from being the majority government with 169 seats, to just two seats and the loss of official party status). Right-wing politics has since seen the rise and fall of the Reform Party and the Canadian Alliance, followed by the rise to government of the new Conservative Party. Further, in 1993 the separatist Bloc Québécois won seats for the first time. It has been a constant presence in parliament since then.

Summary of results

The third, fourth, and fifth parties' results are included in "Other" if the party did not win at least four seats in an election at some point in its history. Results for parties placing sixth or lower (as in the 1926 election) are also included in "Other", as are Independent seats.

Notes

Further reading
  – covers 1878, 1896, 1911, 1917, 1926, 1945, 1957, 1968, 1988, 1995 and 2004

Graphs of results

Bar graph of seats from 1867 to 2021

Line graph of votes

See also

2021 Canadian federal election
Elections in Canada
List of elections in the Province of Canada (pre-Confederation)
List of federal by-elections in Canada
List of political parties in Canada
Voter turnout in Canada

References
 

Federal